Events from 2020 in the Pitcairn Islands.

Incumbents 

 Monarch: Elizabeth II
 Governor: Laura Clarke

Events 
Ongoing – COVID-19 pandemic in Oceania

 3 April – Despite having no cases, all passenger services to the islands were suspended.

Deaths

References 

Years of the 21st century in the Pitcairn Islands
Pitcairn Islands